Kittonkhola is a 2000 Bangladeshi film directed by Abu Sayeed. The story is based on the stage play Kittonkhola by Selim Al Deen. It stars Raisul Islam Asad, Mamunur Rashid, Pijus Bandapadhyay, Jayanta Chattopadhyay, Naila Azad Nupur, Tamalika Karmakar, Azad Abul Kalam, Kamal Ahmed and Habibur Rahman Habib.

Plot
Fair means happiness and festivity. But amid this festivity, there are people with their misfortune & fateful life. Shonai, Boshir, Dalimon, Rustom, Bonosribala and Chayaranjan are amongst these people and 'Kittonkhola' is their tale. Rural culture, festivities contrast against the gross reality of their life struggle. This harsh reality forces Bonosribala to commit suicide. Shonai, Boshir, Chayaranjan and Rustam are baffled by their profession. Darkness looms around them.

Cast 
 Raisul Islam Asad as Sonai
 Mamunur Rashid
 Pijus Bandapadhyay as Idu Contractor
 Jayanta Chattopadhyay
 Naila Azad Nupur as Banasribala
 Tamalika Karmakar as Dalimon
 Azad Abul Kalam as Chhayaranjan

Response
In the summer 2001 issue of Cinemaya, film critic Ahmed Muztaba Zamal wrote "The most outstanding performance in the film is that of Tamalika Karmakar". He also commended the presentation of characters Sonai and Chhayaranjan, but commented that director Abu Sayeed "has been less successful in presenting the other two important characters", Banasribala and Idu Contractor, and said the film "disappoints in places, with its technical imperfections."

Awards
 National Film Awards in nine categories for 2000, including best film, best director, best script, best story, and best dialog.

References

Further reading

External links
 

2000 films
Bengali-language Bangladeshi films
Films scored by Abu Sayeed
Films directed by Abu Sayeed (film director)
2000s Bengali-language films
Best Film National Film Award (Bangladesh) winners
Films whose writer won the Best Screenplay National Film Award (Bangladesh)
Films directed by Nurul Alam Atique
Impress Telefilm films